Order of Courage or Bravery is an Iranian state general order established by "The Council of Iran Ministers" on November 21, 1990. The order has three classes. According to Article 14 of the Regulations on the Awarding of Government Orders of Iran, the Order of Courage awarded by President of Iran to recognize "courage, a high class characteristic of human in achieving distinguished success" in one of the following:
 Volunteer to accomplish a difficult task which is critical for the country
 Accepting a serious state mission or a social duty that is accompanied by potential threats
 Opportune use of physical power and skills to reach a high goal

Recipients

Classes 
It comes in three classes:

See also 
 Order of Merit and Management
 Order of Freedom (Iran)
 Order of Altruism
 Order of Work and Production
 Order of Research
 Order of Mehr
 Order of Justice (Iran)
 Order of Construction
 Order of Knowledge
 Order of Education and Pedagogy
 Order of Persian Politeness
 Order of Independence (Iran)
 Order of Service
 Order of Culture and Art

References

External links 
 Iran Awarding of Government Orders website
 Types of Iran's Orders and their benefits (Persian)

Awards established in 1990
Civil awards and decorations of Iran
1990 establishments in Iran